5-Methoxy-N-propyl-N-isopropyltryptamine (5-MeO-PiPT) is a substituted tryptamine derivative which is claimed to have psychedelic effects. It has been sold as a designer drug, first being identified in 2021 in British Columbia, Canada.

See also 
 4-HO-PiPT
 5-MeO-DPT
 5-MeO-DiPT
 5-MeO-MiPT
 5-MeO-EiPT
 Propylisopropyltryptamine

References 

Tryptamines